The Light Infantry and Mercian Volunteers was a short-lived infantry regiment of the British Army, in existence from 1971 to 1975.

History
The battalion was formed on the 1 April 1971, from the cadres of former Midland infantry battalions that had been reduced as a result of the 1966 Defence White Paper and formation of 
the much smaller TAVR. Its initial structure was:
Headquarters, at Wolseley House, Wolverhampton
A (Worcestershire Regiment) Company, at Worcester(from 7th Battalion, Worcestershire Regiment)
B (5th/6th Battalion Staffordshire Regiment) Company, at Stoke-on-Trent(from 5th/6th Battalion, Staffordshire Regiment)
C (King's Shropshire Light Infantry) Company, at Wellington(from 4th Battalion, King's Shropshire Light Infantry)
D (Herefordshire Light Infantry) Company, at Ross-on-Wye(from 1st Battalion, Herefordshire Light Infantry)
E Company, at Whittimere Street Drill Hall, Walsall(newly raised)

Only four years later, however, the regiment was broken up and the companies were distributed amongst other battalions. Namely: A, B, and E Companies to the 2nd Battalion, Mercian Volunteers as A, B, and D Companies respectively; C Company to 5th Battalion, The Light Infantry, as E Company; and D Company to 6th Battalion, The Light Infantry, with the same lettering.

Deputy Honorary Colonels
The regiment didn't have an Honorary Colonel as a whole, however from 1971–1972 each company maintained their own Deputy Honorary Colonel, in succession to the previous unit. These were:
A Company: Lieutenant-Colonel Alexander W.R.H. Pettigrew, 
B Company: Colonel Charles J. Baines, 
C & D Companies: Lieutenant-Colonel Guy M. Thorneycroft,

References

Infantry regiments of the British Army
Military units and formations established in 1971
Military units and formations disestablished in 1975
The Light Infantry
Worcestershire Regiment

King's Shropshire Light Infantry
Staffordshire Regiment